At Harvard University, the title of University Professor is an honor bestowed upon a very small number of its tenured faculty members whose scholarship and other professional work have attained particular distinction and influence. The University Professorship is Harvard's most distinguished professorial post.

This honor was created in 1935 for "individuals of distinction ... working on the frontiers of knowledge, and in such a way as to cross the conventional boundaries of the specialties."  
The number of University Professors has increased with new endowed gifts to the university. In 2006, there were 21 University Professors. , there are 24 University Professors.

Present Harvard University Professors
Carolyn Abbate - Paul and Catherine Buttenwieser University Professor
Danielle Allen - James Bryant Conant University Professor
Ann M. Blair - Carl H. Pforzheimer University Professor
Peter Galison - Joseph Pellegrino University Professor
Henry Louis Gates Jr. - Alphonse Fletcher University Professor
Annette Gordon-Reed - Carl M. Loeb University Professor
Stephen Greenblatt - John Cogan University Professor
Rebecca M. Henderson - John and Natty McArthur University Professor
Gary King - Albert J. Weatherhead III University Professor 
Marc Kirschner - John Franklin Enders University Professor
Charles M. Lieber - Joshua and Beth Friedman University Professor
Eric Maskin - Adams University Professor
Barry Mazur - Gerhard Gade University Professor
Douglas A. Melton - Xander University Professor
Martha Minow - Three Hundredth Anniversary University Professor
Stephen Owen - James Bryant Conant University Professor
Michael Porter - Bishop William Lawrence University Professor
Amartya Sen - Thomas W. Lamont University Professor
Arlene H. Sharpe -  Kolokotrones University Professorship 
Irwin I. Shapiro - Timken University Professor
Lawrence Summers - Charles W. Eliot University Professor
Cass Sunstein - Robert Walmsley University Professor
Helen Vendler - A. Kingsley Porter University Professor 
George M. Whitesides - Woodford L. and Ann A. Flowers University Professor
William Julius Wilson - Lewis P. and Linda L. Geyser University Professor

Past Harvard University Professors
Paul Farmer (late) - Kolokotrones University Professor
Dale W. Jorgenson (late) - Samuel W. Morris University Professor
Cornel West - Alphonse Fletcher University Professor, resigned chair and left Harvard in 2002

References

Professorships at Harvard University
Lists of people by university or college in Massachusetts
Harvard University-related lists